Samrat Chakrabarti (born 22 August 1975) is a British-American film actor and musician of Indian descent.

Early life 
Born in London to Indian Hindu Bengali immigrant parents from Kolkata. He performed in Indian community functions in Boston, Massachusetts, where he was exposed to music, poetry and the plays of Rabindranath Tagore.

Career

Acting 
Having acted all through school, Chakrabarti's feature film debut came in 2004 in Spike Lee's She Hate Me. Early in his career, he starred opposite Molly Shannon in The Wedding Weekend and then in Manish Acharya's Loins of Punjab Presents. He also had a role in the Australian film, The Waiting City. His film, The War Within, was nominated for an Indie Spirit Award while Bombay Summer, starring Tannishtha Chatterjee won Best Film at the 2009 MIAAC Film Festival. Chakrabarti starred opposite Rebecca Hazelwood in Kissing Cousins and made an appearance in the Yash Raj-produced Bollywood film, New York. Chakrabarti played the character Rishi, a menacing gangster in Ajay Naidu's Ashes. He will be seen soon in Murder in the Dark, produced by Napoleon Dynamites Chris Wyatt.

Chakrabarti has also appeared in television productions. He has appeared on In Treatment (HBO) as Irrfan Khan's son, 30 Rock (NBC) opposite Alec Baldwin, Bored to Death (HBO), Blue Bloods (CBS) opposite Tom Selleck, Law & Order: Criminal Intent (NBC) opposite Chris Noth, Law & Order (NBC), Love Monkey (CBS), The Sopranos (HBO) opposite James Gandolfini, and All My Children. Chakrabarti was a recurring character on FX's Damages opposite Ted Danson.

Music 
Samrat Chakrabarti is also an established international musician. In 1994, he founded Brandeis University's award-winning all male a cappella group, VoiceMale, for which he continues to contribute arrangements and original compositions, including "Please Don't Go," which appears on the album Suit Up and arrangements for the national a cappella compilation Voices Only 2009. He won a U.S. CARA for Best Original Pop/Rock Song for his composition "What's It all About". He is a former member of the a cappella group Five O' Clock Shadow. He was also a part of the group The Hyannis Sound. In 1998, Chakrabarti produced an untitled album for his musical group, JYDE, and composed the song "Startving".

Chakrabarti has also composed the theme song "Dhol Beat" for Loins of Punjab, and Sundaram Tagore's Natvar Bhavsar: Poetics of Color.

Filmography

Television roles

Videogames

External links 

Samrat Chakrabarti official website

1975 births
American male film actors
American male television actors
American people of Bengali descent
Living people
American male actors of Indian descent
British emigrants to the United States
21st-century American male actors
Brandeis University alumni
Harvard University alumni